was a Japanese scholar of Arabic and Persian literature and history and the Japanese translator of Salman Rushdie's novel The Satanic Verses. He was murdered in the wake of fatwas issued by Ayatollah Ruhollah Khomeini of Iran – who, by the time of Igarashi's murder, had died – calling for the death of the book's author and "those involved in its publication." His murder remains unsolved.

Early life and education
Igarashi was born in 1947. He completed his doctoral programme in Islamic art at the University of Tokyo in 1976, and was a research fellow at the Royal Academy of Iran until the Islamic Revolution in 1979.

Career
Igarashi was an associate professor of comparative Islamic culture at the University of Tsukuba. He translated Avicenna's The Canon of Medicine and Salman Rushdie's The Satanic Verses and wrote books on Islam, including The Islamic Renaissance and Medicine and Wisdom of the East.

Death

In early 1989, Supreme Leader of Iran Ruhollah Khomeini issued a fatwa, calling for the death of "the author of the Satanic Verses book, which is against Islam, the Prophet and the Qur'an". In March 1991, Khomeini's successor Ali Khamenei issued a further fatwa and multimillion-dollar bounty for the death of "any of those involved in its publication who are aware of its content". In 1990, one year after the issuing of these fatwas, Igarashi and his publisher Gianni Palma held a press conference in Tokyo to announce their translation into Japanese of The Satanic Verses. Shi'a Muslims attended the event in order to protest the publication, and midway through, a Pakistani Muslim rushed onto the stage and attempted to assault Palma. The attacker was arrested and deported.

A year and a half later, Igarashi was stabbed repeatedly in the face and arms by an unknown assailant and died. His body was found on 12 July 1991 in his office at the University of Tsukuba.

In 2006, the statute of limitations on the stabbing expired. Kenneth M. Pollack alleged in The Persian Puzzle that the attack was a covert operation by the Iranian Revolutionary Guards.

See also

List of unsolved murders

References

1947 births
1991 deaths
20th-century Japanese translators
Deaths by stabbing in Japan
English–Japanese translators
Fatwas
Japanese murder victims
Male murder victims
People from Niigata (city)
People murdered in Japan
Salman Rushdie
University of Tokyo alumni
Unsolved murders in Japan
Victims of Islamic terrorism